Chloroclystis rubrinotata is a moth in the family Geometridae. It was described by William Warren in 1893. It is endemic to India.

Adults are green with traces of waved lines on the wings. The forewings have a slight subbasal line and a large rufous quadrate patch on the costal area, bounded on the inner side by an oblique black line, and on outer side by a black line. The hindwings have three indistinct lines on the basal half  and a series of prominent black specks on the postmedial line.

References

External links

Moths described in 1893
rubrinotata
Endemic fauna of India